Phyllonorycter flava is a moth of the family Gracillariidae. It is known from Asia Minor.

The length of the forewings is about 3.9 mm.

The larvae probably feed on Quercus species. They mine the leaves of their host plant.

External links
Blattminierende Lepidopteren Aus Dem Nahen Und Mittleren Osten. I. Teil

flava
Moths of Asia
Moths described in 1975